Robert John Lunt (born 11 December 1973) is an English former professional footballer who played as a winger. He played in the English Football League for Wrexham, and also played non-league football for Hyde United.

References

1973 births
Living people
English footballers
Association football wingers
Wrexham A.F.C. players
Hyde United F.C. players
English Football League players